This is a list of people associated with Tokyo, Japan's Hibiya High School or its predecessor, the First Tokyo Middle School.

Students

References

Hibiya
High schools in Tokyo